This is a round-up of the 1988 Sligo Intermediate Football Championship. Tourlestrane were relegated to Intermediate level for the first time, but ensured a swift return to Senior football after defeating Calry/St. Joseph's, themselves having emerged from the Junior grade, in the final.

Quarter finals

Semi-finals

Sligo Intermediate Football Championship Final

Sligo Intermediate Football Championship
Sligo Intermediate Football Championship